Gp Capt Abhinandan Varthaman VrC (born 21 June 1983) is an Indian Air Force fighter pilot who was held captive in Pakistan for 60 hours after his aircraft was shot down in an aerial dogfight. He was awarded with Vir Chakra by the Indian government for allegedly downing a PAF F-16 with his MiG-21 Bison, though his claim has been debunked.

Pakistan released videos and images showing Varthaman being rescued from a violent mob of villagers by its soldiers, receiving first aid, and being questioned while blindfolded. Varthaman was subsequently released from Pakistani captivity on what Pakistan said was humanitarian grounds, and returned to India through Wagah border crossing on 1 March 2019. 

He was promoted to the rank of Group captain from the rank of Wing Commander in November, 2021.

Career and personal life 
Abhinandan Varthaman was born on 21 June 1983 in Tamil Jain Family. His father is a retired Indian Air Force (IAF) Air Marshal (OF-8) and his mother is a doctor.

Varthaman was educated at Sainik School, Amaravathinagar. He graduated from the National Defence Academy and was commissioned into the combat (fighter) stream of the IAF as a flying officer on 19 June 2004. He was trained at the IAF centres in Bathinda and Halwara, promoted to flight lieutenant on 19 June 2006, and to squadron leader on 8 July 2010. Varthaman was a Su-30 MKI fighter pilot before being assigned to the MiG-21 Bison squadron. He was promoted to wing commander on 19 June 2017.

Varthaman is married to a retired Squadron Leader and lives in Chennai. They have two children.

2019 capture 

On 27 February 2019, Varthaman was flying a MiG-21 as a part of a sortie that was scrambled to intercept an intrusion into Jammu & Kashmir by Pakistani aircraft. He lost communications with the IAF command and inadvertently crossed into Pakistani airspace during a dogfight that ensued, during which his aircraft was struck by a missile.

Local villagers said Varthaman could be identified as an Indian pilot by the Indian flag on his parachute. Upon landing, Varthaman asked the villagers whether he was in India, to which a young boy lied by saying "Yes." Varthaman reportedly raised pro-India slogans, to which the locals responded with pro-Pakistan slogans. Varthaman began firing warning shots. The villagers captured and manhandled Varthaman before he was rescued by the Pakistan Army.

Later that day, the Indian Ministry of External Affairs confirmed an Indian pilot was missing in action after a MiG-21 Bison fighter aircraft was lost while engaging with Pakistani jets. A statement released by the IAF also said before the crash, Varthaman had shot down a PAF Lockheed Martin F-16. At a media briefing on 2 March 2019, nearly two days after the aerial engagement between PAF and IAF, the IAF displayed the parts of AIM-120 AMRAAM missiles, which could be used only by the PAF's F-16. The IAF also said they had identified the electronic signatures of the aircraft and confirmed that F-16 were used during the skirmish. As claimed by Indian media, according to an agreement between the US and Pakistan, Pakistan is only allowed to use the F-16 against terrorists. However, Foreign Policy magazine quoting an anonymous U.S. official stated that the agreement did not involve any such terms "limiting the use of the F-16s." Pakistan's Inter-Services Public Relations Director General refuted the later claims and said F-16s had not been used in the incident. The US-based Foreign Policy magazine, quoting two anonymous US defence ministry officials, reported in April 2019 that an audit didn't find any Pakistani F-16s missing, and that all jets were accounted for. This claim was refuted a day later owing to a statement by the US defence ministry which stated it was “not aware” of any investigation that was conducted to ascertain if Pakistan had lost an F-16 in a dogfight with Indian fighter jets on February 27.  While the US defence ministry was unaware of the "F-16 count", the US State Department distanced itself from the "F-16 count" news report, saying in response to a direct request to confirm or deny it, “As a matter of policy, the Department does not publicly comment on details of government-to-government agreements on end-use monitoring of US-origin defence articles.” and highlighted that “It is important to note that since January 2018, the United States government has suspended security assistance to Pakistan.”

Videos 
Videos and images released by Pakistani authorities showed Varthaman being rescued from a violent mob by Pakistani soldiers and being interrogated while tied and blindfolded with a bloody face. Other videos showed him receiving first aid and being further interrogated over tea. The media received a mixed reception; some commentators criticised the reports as a "vulgar display" while others praised the intervention of the Pakistani soldiers when Varthaman was in the hands of the mob and was being beaten. The release of the videos was suspected of being a violation of the Geneva Conventions and were deleted by Pakistani authorities after they went viral. Experts gave different opinions about the validity of the Geneva Conventions in this case.

A few videos surfaced from Pakistan where two parachutes could be seen in the sky with streaks of smoke nearby, these videos were used as a point to favour Indian claims of two pilots downed by many Indian defence experts and media houses.

Repatriation and subsequent developments

On 28 February 2019, Prime Minister of Pakistan Imran Khan announced at a joint sitting of the Parliament of Pakistan, that the government had decided to release Varthaman the next day as a "gesture of peace". If some news sources are to be believed, "India and Pakistan came perilously close to firing missiles at each other on February 27, with Prime Minister Narendra Modi deciding to up the ante after the capture of MiG-21 Bison pilot Wing Commander Abhinandan Varthaman by Pakistan, and Research and Analysis Wing secretary Anil Dhasmana communicating to his Pakistan counterpart Inter Services Intelligence chief Lt Gen (Later Gen) Asim Munir that there would be an escalation in the Indian offensive if the pilot was harmed."  Shah Mehmood Qureshi, the Foreign Minister of Pakistan, said his government announced the release of the IAF Wing Commander out of a desire for peace and that there was no compulsion or pressure on Pakistan, as was implied by the Indian media. However, The New York Times reported that several outside countries including United States and China had been urging Pakistan to release the Indian pilot to de-escalate the crisis.

Later in October 2020, a senior opposition leader who was Speaker of the National Assembly during the PML-N government in Pakistan, Sardar Ayaz Sadiq had claimed in the National Assembly that Wing Commander Abhinandan Varthaman was released after Foreign Minister Shah Mahmood Qureshi told a meeting of Pakistan's top leaders that India would attack Pakistan if Varthaman weren't released. Ayaz Sadiq faced flak from the Pakistani government and the public for making such statements.  

Varthaman crossed the India-Pakistan border at Wagah on 1 March 2019. At a rally, the Indian Prime Minister Narendra Modi welcomed Varthaman's release, saying the nation was proud of him. A demeaning video of Abhinandan was released by the PAF to the Pakistani media hours before his release. IAF later said it had been filmed while Varthaman was under duress. A medical check-up upon his return located multiple bruises and a fractured rib but no 'significant injuries'. Varthaman said the Pakistani authorities did not physically torture him but subjected him to considerable "mental harassment". Pakistan said he was treated in accordance with the Geneva Conventions.

Akhil Bharatiya Digambar Jain Mahasamiti chairperson Manidra Jain announced Varthaman would be awarded the Bhagwan Mahavir Ahimsa Puraskar on 17 April 2019, the date of Mahavir Jayanti. In August that same year, he was presented with the Vir Chakra gallantry award.

After the government's decision to release Varthaman was announced, a petition was filed before the Islamabad High Court (IHC) seeking an injunction to stop the process but the court dismissed it on the same day. The petition argued Varthaman must be released only after the cessation of active hostilities, as per the Geneva Conventions, since the Indian pilot “was arrested when he was on a mission against Pakistan.” The petition was rejected by the Islamabad High Court, citing the consensus of the parliamentarians and that "When all the parliamentarians agree at a point...[a] debate over it is unnecessary". In addition the IHC Chief Justice Minallah also stated that the courts do not have the power to intervene in foreign affairs, according to a Supreme Court verdict in 2014.

Aftermath

Abhinandhan moustache

Varthaman's style of moustache has become popular in India and is widely called the "Abhinandan cut". 

The style is similar to a combination of old gunslinger moustache and mutton chops worn by Franz Joseph I of Austria. It resembles the moustache worn by actor Suriya in the Singam film series and Rajinikanth's moustache in Petta (2019). 

Indian actor Ranveer Singh's barber, Darshan Yewalekar, has quoted saying that "the beard sported by the IAF pilot will soon be called India's very own Varthaman style." A number of companies used the moustache in their advertisements. Dairy company Amul produced a video showing a young girl wearing an Abhinandan-shaped milk moustache. The advertisement was posted on Twitter and received more than 170,000 views within 24 hours. Pizza Hut also posted a tweet showing the Abhinandan moustache on 3 March 2019.

"The Tea is Fantastic" (internet meme)
In 2019, after Abhinandhan was captured by Pakistani forces, a video of him taken by a soldier went viral in which he was seen being interrogated while drinking Pakistani tea. The interrogator asked him different questions about his health and how he was treated to which he acknowledged the humane treatment by the Pakistani Military. The interrogator then asks if he was enjoying his tea to which Abhinandhan replied "The tea is Fantastic". This statement of Varthaman went viral and turned into an internet meme in the Pakistani Online community.

Awards and decorations

See also 
 2019 Balakot airstrike

References

Living people
1983 births
Indian aviators
Indian Air Force officers
Indian prisoners of war
Prisoners of war held by Pakistan
Shot-down aviators
Tamil people
People from Tamil Nadu
National Defence Academy (India) alumni
Recipients of the Vir Chakra
Sainik School alumni
Tamil Jains
21st-century Indian Jains
21st-century Indian military personnel